Nahid is a 2015 Iranian drama film directed by Ida Panahandeh. It was screened in the Un Certain Regard section at the 2015 Cannes Film Festival where it won a Promising Future Prize (special jury prize for debut films).

References

External links

2015 films
2015 drama films
Iranian drama films
2010s Persian-language films
2015 directorial debut films